Arthropeina fulva is a species of fly in the family Xylomyidae, the "wood soldier flies".

Distribution
Santa Catarina, Brazil.

References

Xylomyidae
Taxa named by Erwin Lindner
Diptera of South America
Insects described in 1949